In enzymology, a 4-hydroxyphenylacetaldehyde dehydrogenase is an enzyme that catalyzes the chemical reaction

4-hydroxyphenylacetaldehyde + NAD+ + H2O  4-hydroxyphenylacetate + NADH + 2 H+

The 3 substrates of this enzyme are 4-hydroxyphenylacetaldehyde, NAD+, and H2O, whereas its 3 products are 4-hydroxyphenylacetate, NADH, and H+.

This enzyme belongs to the family of oxidoreductases, specifically those acting on the aldehyde or oxo group of donor with NAD+ or NADP+ as acceptor.  The systematic name of this enzyme class is 4-hydroxyphenylacetaldehyde:NAD+ oxidoreductase. This enzyme is also called 4-HPAL dehydrogenase.  This enzyme participates in tyrosine metabolism.

References

 

EC 1.2.1
NADH-dependent enzymes
Enzymes of unknown structure